The following are the national records in Olympic weightlifting in Samoa. Records are maintained in each weight class for the snatch lift, clean and jerk lift, and the total for both lifts by the Samoa Weightlifting Federation (SWF).

Current records

Men

Women

Historical records

Men (1998–2018)

Women (1998–2018)

References

External links

records
Samoa
Olympic weightlifting
Weightlifting